Andrew James Fisher is Professor of Physics in the Department of Physics and Astronomy at University College London. His team is part of the Condensed Matter and Materials Physics group, and based in the London Centre for Nanotechnology (a joint venture between UCL and Imperial College, London).

Research
His research area is in understanding the behaviour of electrons in nanostructures. Predicting the behaviour of electrons using quantum mechanics theory, to compare with experimental data. Current funded project topics include:
 Quantum de-coherence and computation in condensed-phase systems
 Electrons in atomic-scale quantum wires
 Formation of molecules on interstellar dust grains
 Theory of scanning tunnelling microscopy in liquids
 Development of techniques to study coherent inelastic transport
 Organic molecules on semiconductor surfaces

Awards
 Maxwell Medal and Prize, Institute of Physics, 1998

Education and career
He was educated at Abingdon School from 1976 until 1983 before going to Clare College, Cambridge. Fisher lectured at UCL from October 1995. Previously he lectured at Durham University (1993–1995).

He was a Junior Research Fellow at St John's College Oxford, working in the Clarendon Laboratory of the Oxford Physics Department (1989–1993). During this period he spent a year at the IBM Zurich Research Laboratory (1991–1992).

Personal life
Fisher is a violinist and is married to Alison Smart, a classical singer. He has two sons, Thomas and Hugh.

Bibliography

Selected articles

See also
 List of Old Abingdonians

References

External links

British physicists
Academics of Durham University
Academics of University College London
Living people
People educated at Abingdon School
1965 births